Ploshcha Lyenina ("Lenin Square") is a Minsk Metro station.

Overview
The station, opened on June 24, 1984 is part of the Maskoŭskaja line and serves the main railway station of the city: Minsk-Pasažyrski.

From 1992 to 2003 the station has been called "Ploshcha Nyezalyezhnastsi" (lit: Independence Square), but later the original name of the station was restored. According to head of technical department of the Minsk subway, the official decision to rename the station "Lenin Square" to "Independence Square" was never taken, there were only verbal instructions of government.

It is a transfer station to the Vakzaĺnaja station on the Zelenaluzhskaya line.

It is one of three on the Minsk Metro to have been built with an entrance in an existing building, the other two being Kastryčnickaja and Kupalaŭskaja.

Gallery

References

Minsk Metro stations
Railway stations opened in 1984